Rachael King (born 1970) is an author from New Zealand.

Background 
King was born in 1970, in Hamilton, New Zealand. In 2001 she received a Master of Arts in creative writing from Victoria University of Wellington.

King is a bass guitarist and has played with several bands on the Flying Nun label.

King's father is the historian and author Michael King and her brother is filmmaker Jonathan King.

Works 
King has published three novels:
 The Sound of Butterflies (2006, Random House)
 Magpie Hall (2009, Random House)
 Red Rocks (2012, Random House), novel for children
Short stories by King have been published in several anthologies including in Home: New Short Short Stories by New Zealand Writers and Creative Juices.

In 2013, King became Literary Director of the WORD Christchurch Writers and Readers Festival. She was a judge for the New Zealand Book Awards for Children and Young Adults in 2017.

Awards 
In 2007, King's first novel The Sound of Butterflies won the NZSA Hubert Church Best First Book Award for Fiction at the Montana New Zealand Book Awards.

Her novel for children, Red Rocks, was shortlisted for the Junior Fiction category in the 2013 New Zealand Post Children's Book Awards and won the LIANZA Esther Glen Award.

King was the 2008 Ursula Bethell Writer in Residence at the University of Canterbury. She has also won the 2005 Lilian Ida Smith Award.

References

External links 
 Official website

Living people
1970 births
People from Hamilton, New Zealand
New Zealand fiction writers
New Zealand women novelists
New Zealand women short story writers
International Institute of Modern Letters alumni